Green Gravel  is an English singing game and folk song. It has a Roud Folk Song Index number of 1368.

Lyrics and performance
The version collected in Manchester in 1835:

The players joined hands and walk around in a ring. At the end of the text, one person is named and then stays in the ring but faces outwards; the song begins again and a different person is named at the end, then taking their place in the centre. Lucy Broadwood and J. A. Fuller Maitland recorded in their 1893 book English County Songs that Green Gravel was a dramatic representation of mourning.

See also
List of nursery rhymes

Notes

1835 songs
English children's songs
English folk songs
English nursery rhymes
Songwriter unknown
Traditional children's songs